Zamalek Sporting Club is an Egyptian handball club based in Cairo. Zamalek Sporting Club One of the largest African clubs and the club with the most championships in the African Champions League, where it won the 1st ever African handball Champions League, which was in 1979, and 1st ever winner the African Handball Cup Winners' Cup which was in 1985, 1st Egyptian Team winner the African Handball Super Cup in 2002. Zamalek is The most African teams Qualified for the IHF Super Globe.

African Record

Summary 

 African Handball Champions League: 12 (Record)
: 1979, 1980, 1981, 1986, 1991, 2001, 2002, 2011, 2015 , 2017, 2018, 2019
: 2012, 2022
: 1984, 1992, 2016
 African Handball Cup Winners' Cup: 6
:  1985, 2009, 2010, 2011, 2016, 2022
: 1987, 2012
: 1986, 1990, 1993, 2007
 African Handball Super Cup: 7
: 2002, 2010, 2011, 2012, 2018, 2019, 2021
: 2016, 2017, 2022

African Handball Champions League

1979 African Handball Champions League
This competition was held in Round-robin, and 3 teams took part.

 Round 1.

 Round 2.

 Final Ranking.

1980 African Handball Champions League
This competition was held in Knock-out Rounds, on a Home & Away, and 8 teams took part.

 Quarter Final.

 Semi Final.

Cimencam Douala withdrew before the 2nd Leg.

 Final.

 Final Ranking.

1981 African Handball Champions League
This competition was held in groups format, and 7 teams took part.

 Group Stage.

 Semi Final.

 Final.

 Final Ranking.

1986 African Handball Champions League
This competition was held in groups format, and 11 teams took part.

 Group Stage.

 Final Qualifying Group Stage.

 Final.

 Final Ranking.

1991 African Handball Champions League
This competition was held in groups format, and 8 teams took part.

 Group Stage.

 Semi Final.

 Final.

 Final Ranking.

2001 African Handball Champions League
 Final.

 Final Ranking.

2002 African Handball Champions League
 Final.

 Final Ranking.

2011 African Handball Champions League
This competition was held in groups format, and 13 teams took part.

 Group Stage.

 Quarter Final.

 Semi Final.

 Final.

 Final Ranking.

2015 African Handball Champions League
This competition was held in groups format, and 15 teams took part.

 Group Stage.

 Quarter Final.

 Semi Final.

 Final.

 Final Ranking.

2017 African Handball Champions League
This competition was held in groups format, and 14 teams took part.

 Group Stage.

 Quarter Final.

 Semi Final.

 Final.

 Final Ranking.

2018 African Handball Champions League
This competition was held in groups format, and 9 teams took part.

 Group Stage.

 Quarter Final.

 Semi Final.

 Final.

 Final Ranking.

2019 African Handball Champions League
This competition was held in groups format, and 10 teams took part.

 Group Stage.

 Quarter Final.

 Semi Final.

 Final.

 Final Ranking.

African Handball Cup Winners' Cup

1985 African Handball Cup Winners' Cup
This competition was held in Round-robin, and 3 teams took part.

 Final Ranking.

2009 African Handball Cup Winners' Cup
This competition was held in groups format, and 9 teams took part.

 Group Stage.

 Quarter Final.

 Semi Final.

 Final.

 Final Ranking.

2010 African Handball Cup Winners' Cup
This competition was held in groups format, and 16 teams took part.

 Group Stage.

 Final Qualifying Group Stage.

 Semi Final.

 Final.

 Final Ranking.

2011 African Handball Cup Winners' Cup
This competition was held in groups format, and 8 teams took part.

 Group Stage.

 Semi Final.

 Final.
 

 Final Ranking

2016 African Handball Cup Winners' Cup
This competition was held in groups format, and 11 teams took part.

 Group Stage.

 Quarter Final.

 Semi Final.

 Final.

 Final Ranking.

2022 African Handball Cup Winners' Cup
This competition was held in groups format, and 8 teams took part.

 Group Stage.

 Quarter Final.

 Semi Final.

 Final.

 Final Ranking.

Africa Handball Super Cup

2002 African Handball Super Cup

2010 African Handball Super Cup

2011 African Handball Super Cup

2012 African Handball Super Cup

2018 African Handball Super Cup

2019 African Handball Super Cup

2021 African Handball Super Cup

Derby Record 

Derby Results in the African Competitions.

References

Handball competitions in Africa
Egyptian handball clubs